"And She Was" is a song by the American band Talking Heads, from their 1985 album Little Creatures. The song was written by David Byrne, who also provides the lead vocals.

The song is musically notable for its unusual use of modulation. The overall key of the song is E major, however the bridge to the chorus is in F major. The second bridge back to the verse is in the key of G major (Chords B minor to G major, "She was glad about it...")

The accompanying music video was directed by avant-garde filmmaker Jim Blashfield, who cites the style of Terry Gilliam as one of his major influences.

Background
"I used to know a blissed-out hippie-chick in Baltimore," recalled Byrne in the liner notes of Once in a Lifetime: The Best of Talking Heads. "She once told me that she used to do  acid (the drug, not music) and lay down on the field by the Yoo-hoo chocolate soda factory. Flying out of her body, etc etc. It seemed like such a tacky kind of transcendence… but it was real! A new kind of religion being born out of heaps of rusted cars and fast food joints. And this girl was flying above it all, but in it too."

Drummer Chris Frantz said of the song, "It's a story about a woman who has the power to levitate above the ground and to check out all her neighbors from a kind of bird's eye view. And the guy who's writing the song is in love with her and he kinda wishes she would just be more normal and, like, come on back down to the ground [Laughs], but she doesn't. She goes floating over the backyard and past the buildings and the schools and stuff and is absolutely [upside-down] to him in every way."

Reception
Cash Box said that the song "displays David Byrne’s discreet pop ingenuity and Talking Heads' inimitable rhythmic pump" and has "a strangely surrealistic lyric and a singalong chorus."

In popular culture
The song was featured in the 1989 film Look Who's Talking, in the 2005 films Bewitched and Sky High, and the 2016 film Storks.

Charts

Weekly Charts

Year-end charts

Notes

Talking Heads songs
1985 singles
EMI Records singles
Music videos directed by Jim Blashfield
Songs written by David Byrne
Songs about drugs
Sire Records singles
Song recordings produced by David Byrne
Song recordings produced by Jerry Harrison
1985 songs